Fuel is a jazz fusion album by organist/keyboardist Larry Young, released on the Arista Records label.

Reception

Allmusic awarded the album 3½ stars and stated it contains "exotic tunes."

Track listing
 "Fuel for the Fire" (Philips, Torano, Young) - 6:06
 "I Ching (Book of Changes)" (Young) - 6:25
 "Turn off the Lights" (Logan, Saunders, Young) - 7:05
 "Floating" (Torano) - 4:13
 "H + J = B (Hustle + Jam = Bread)" (Young) - 6:19
 "People Do Be Funny" (Philips, Young) - 3:43
 "New York Electric Street Music" (Saunders, Torano, Young) - 8:34

Personnel
Larry Young - keyboards
 Santiago Torano - guitar
Fernando Saunders - bass, backing vocals
 Rob Gottfried - drums, percussion
 Laura "Tequila" Logan - vocals

References

Larry Young (musician) albums
1975 albums
Arista Records albums